Devil May Cry is a series of video games set in the present, created by Hideki Kamiya, a video-game designer and developed by his employer Capcom and Clover Studio. The series' success has led to comic books, novelizations, an anime series, guides, collectibles and a variety of action figures. The first game focuses on devil hunter Dante's mission to avenge the death of his mother, Eva, by exterminating demons. In the process he encounters his long-lost twin brother, Vergil, with whom he has a dysfunctional relationship. As the story progresses, Dante encounter his father's nemesis, a demon emperor, Mundus, who is found to be responsible for the murder of Dante's mother.

Years after the first game, Capcom developed new Devil May Cry games with new characters. In Devil May Cry 2, an older Dante aids a woman named Lucia in freeing a town from the demons. In Devil May Cry 3: Dante's Awakening, a younger Dante awakens his demonic powers when confronting his brother and matures upon seeing Lady, a woman struggling to redeem her family. Devil May Cry 4 and Devil May Cry 5 focus on a young demon hunter named Nero who is related to Dante, as well as V, a young man from 5 who wishes somebody would defeat the demon king Urizen. Ninja Theory also created a reboot titled DmC: Devil May Cry that follows an alternate version of Dante as he learns of his heritage while confronting demons controlling Limbo.

Nero and several characters in Devil May Cry 2 and the later games were conceived by several staff members, most notably Bingo Morihashi with designers Daigo Ikeno and Tatsuya Yoshikawa, taking over. While each game changes the cast's designs, the RE Engine was used for Devil May Cry 5 to give them a more realistic look. Dante's characterization and role in the games was well received by game journalists with the recurring cast being praised since Devil May Cry 3 because of the handling of the narrative.

Conception and influences
Series creator Hideki Kamiya said that the title character from the manga series Cobra, by Buichi Terasawa, was the basis for Dante. Dante wears a red cloak to make the character's actions more eye-catching; red is the traditional Japanese color for a hero. The game is very loosely based on the Italian poem the Divine Comedy by its use of allusions, including the game's protagonist Dante (named after Dante Alighieri) and other characters like Vergil (Virgil) and Trish (Beatrice Portinari). Dante and Lucia dressed in Diesel fashions appealed to the developers.

Shortly after the release of Devil May Cry 2, Hideaki Itsuno decided Capcom's staff should develop a new video game, Devil May Cry 3: Dante's Awakening. Morihashi was once again employed, but this time took on a bigger role during the game's development. As he had no experience planning, he was given the role of writing the scenario. The game's main character, Dante, was given a different characterization than in the first Devil May Cry because his original creator, Hideki Kamiya, was not going to be involved with the project. While feeling his own take on the character did not equal the popularity of the original one, Bingo Morihashi enjoyed Dante's role in the game. Morihashi felt challenged creating the character of Vergil since he had no prior design experience yet he had to come up with an entire new one for the artists. Dante and Vergi's Devil Trigger forms were designed by Kazuma Kaneko of Atlus. The Capcom staff was impressed with Kaneko's work, and Daigo Ikeno felt that it was not difficult to model.

Devil May Cry 4 producer Hiroyuki Kobayashi said before the game's release that he wanted to make Dante appear more powerful than the other protagonist, Nero, to contrast the strength of a "veteran" with that of a "rookie". The series' storyline also required Dante to demonstrate his power after the first game and its prequel, Devil May Cry 3: Dante's Awakening. Kobayashi said, "When creating a sequel, you don't want to make a character weak again from the start for no good reason. Everyone wanted to see Dante be just as powerful as they remembered him," emphasizing that playing as Dante without his previous abilities would otherwise feel "very strange". Both main characters' capabilities were part of the series' early development.

Several weapons in the series are character-specific. Character designer Tatsuya Yoshikawa said, "When working on this sort of game, the design doesn't come from just one person, it is necessary to take the history of the series and the feelings of the fans into consideration." Before designing the characters in Devil May Cry 4, Yoshikawa consulted staff members who had previously worked on the series to familiarize himself with previous elements. The characters were designed to emphasize their motion, and some demonic antagonists in Devil May Cry 4 resemble angels. These characters were designed to be attractive, while providing a contrast to other demons in the game. Yoshikawa noted that several main characters were somewhat difficult to design, but Nero was one of the greatest challenges of his career since the character would have to be accepted by the public and fit in the series' universe.

With regard to Devil May Cry 5,  because the game's narrative was focused on Dante, Nero and V, Lady and Trish could not appear as playable characters again. In addition, Capcom's Matt Walker claimed Vergil would not be a playable character in the game, leaving "a bitter taste" in fans mouths. Itsuno explained the development team aimed for a "photo-realistic" graphics style. The returning characters' designs involved slight alterations to their Devil May Cry 4 iterations to fit their personalities. However, while few of the ideas for Dante and Nero were scrapped, V underwent nearly twenty redesigns. The new designs were also inspired by Carol Christian Poell as well as Daniel Craig and Benedict Cumberbatch.

Capcom used an older incarnation of Nero, so he would be "at the top of his game in body and mind". Because the game's graphics are meant to be as realistic as possible, each character is modeled after an actor. The staff wanted to generate a major emotional scene when Vergil reappears in the climax confronting his brother. As a result, Nero stops the brothers' feud and awakens his demonic powers to face his father. Itsuno said that Dante has a more mature personality and still wishes to protect humanity and honor the legacy of his father, Sparda.

Protagonists

Dante

Dante, the series' primary protagonist, is a mercenary specializing in the paranormal and the main playable character in the first three Devil May Cry games. He is one of the twin sons of Sparda, a demon knight who sided with humanity and drove back an invasion of the human world by demons about 2,000 years before the series' events. The character was voiced by Drew Coombs in the original Devil May Cry and Matthew Kaminsky in Devil May Cry 2. Reuben Langdon voiced Dante in all subsequent appearances. Dante's Japanese voice is provided by Toshiyuki Morikawa.

Nero

Nero is the secondary protagonist of the franchise, introduced in Devil May Cry 4. An orphan adopted by the Sparda-worshipping Order of the Sword, Nero grew up to become a Holy Knight of the Order. He does not get along well with others and prefers to work alone, so he is usually given the Order's "special assignments". He is the son of Vergil, which also makes him the nephew of Dante and the grandson of Sparda. The character is voiced by Johnny Yong Bosch in English, and by Kaito Ishikawa in the Japanese versions of Devil May Cry 4: Special Edition. Nero returns as one of the primary protagonists in Devil May Cry 5.

Lucia
Lucia, along with Dante, is one of the two protagonists in Devil May Cry 2. An agile fighter, she uses two ornately carved curved daggers. Like Dante, she can Devil Trigger (transform into a "harpy", a birdlike demon of light). Character designer Daigo Ikeno stated that the team aimed for a contrast between Lucia and Trish, making them look as though they were from different races. Lucia is a member of Protectorate, a clan of guardians in the Vie de Marli with the blood of devils. She invites Dante to her island so her adoptive mother, Matier, can ask him to help them defeat Arius (a man who has turned their land into a devils' paradise). Dante accepts, and he and Lucia begin their quests. The player later learns that Lucia is actually Chi, a devil bred by Arius but abandoned as defective. When she reaches Arius, Dante has already defeated him and rides his motorcycle to the demon world to stop an ancient demon. After Dante leaves, Arius (now a monster) rises from the ruins and attacks Lucia; she defeats him, and awaits Dante's return. Lucia is voiced by Françoise Gralewski.

V
V is one of the protagonists of Devil May Cry 5, a mysterious figure who hires Dante to come with him to Red Grave City to subdue Urizen. He is ultimately revealed to be the discarded humanity of Vergil seeking to merge back with Urizen to their original form. In battle, V uses three demon familiars created from trace memories of Nelo Angelo to weaken his opponents so he can land the deathblow. Following Vergil's restoration, now fully independent beings, the hawk-like Griffon leads the panther-like Shadow and the golem Nightmare to attack Dante of their own free will, and all three die fighting him. V is motion captured by Owen Hamze and voiced by Brian Hanford in English, and is voiced by Kōki Uchiyama in the Japanese version.

Antagonists

Vergil

Dante's older identical twin brother, Vergil embraces his demonic side and is obsessed with gaining power. He is the primary antagonist in Devil May Cry 3 and a playable character in the game's special edition, ending up as Mundus's servant Nelo Angelo in the first Devil May Cry  game. While appearing in Devil May Cry 4 and playable in its special edition to hint at his relation to Nero, fragments of Nelo Angelo's form were used as the basis for the Angelo-type demons developed by Agnus for Sanctus's use. Vergil returns in Devil May Cry 5 where he is revealed to be Nero's father while stealing the Yamato back for his use. Later, Dante's and Vergil's rivalry is a friendly one. Vergil also appears as a playable character in the crossover fighting game, Ultimate Marvel vs. Capcom 3. In English, Vergil is voiced by Daniel Southworth; Nelo Angelo is voiced by David Kelley in Devil May Cry. In Japanese, he is voiced by Hiroaki Hirata.

Mundus
Mundus is the Emperor of the Underworld and the overarching antagonist of the series, starting with his role as the main antagonist of the original Devil May Cry. He is portrayed as a semi-amorphous creature with three orb-like eyes who takes the form of a white-skinned seraph with a third eye on his forehead and a scar on his chest. Millennia ago, Mundus led the demons under his command in a long and brutal war with humanity, until he was betrayed and defeated by the strongest of his knights, Sparda, who sealed his powers and imprisoned him in his own realm. After Sparda's death due to the loss of his immortality, Mundus took revenge by sending his minions to murder Dante's mother, Eva, and seemingly killing his brother Vergil as well. In the aftermath of Devil May Cry 3, Mundus captured Vergil when he challenged him and turned the young man into the first of the Angelo demons. As the primary antagonist in Devil May Cry, Mundus is shown to have spent centuries posing as a statue on the forbidding Mallet Island, steadily corrupting the inhabitants and using his powers to remake the island in his own image. He then crafts a demon named Trish, making her look identical to Eva, and sending her to hire Dante to kill him so he can be destroyed. Mundus carefully monitored Dante's progress throughout the island, watching as he defeated his servants one by one and even stepping in to personally murder his servant Griffon when he begs Mundus for more power. Finally, when even Trish proved unable to stop Dante, Mundus tried to strike him down with his magic, but Trish took the attack instead, leaving her close to death. Dante's anger transformed him into the form of his father Sparda, and he defeated Mundus in personal combat. Despite this, Mundus crossed over, and tried to crush Dante with his decomposing body. Trish then combined her own magic with Dante's weapons, allowing him to seal Mundus' powers once again. Before he was banished back to his realm, Mundus vowed to one day take his revenge on Dante and conquer all of the human world.

A statue of Mundus can be seen briefly in Devil May Cry 2. He is also referenced in Devil May Cry 5 as having eaten the fruit of the Qliphoth to become ruler of the Underworld. In Dante's storyline in the PlayStation 2 version of Viewtiful Joe, he possesses Captain Blue to take revenge on Dante and Trish. Mundus also appears in the second Devil May Cry novel in a parallel universe, where he is confronted by Dante and Nelo Angelo's forces. An alternate version of Mundus appears as the main antagonist of DmC: Devil May Cry, this time portrayed as a powerful demon in human form who secretly rules over humanity.

Arius
Arius, the primary antagonist in Devil May Cry 2, is an insane, wealthy businessman who owns an international company, Uroboros. He wants to find the legendary Arcana, artifacts which would allow him to raise Argosax from the demonic realm and use his power to control the world. Human at the beginning of the game, Arius has access to powerful magic (which enables him to fight demon hunters like Dante) and can create his own demons. Near the end of the game, in Lucia's scenario, Arius survives his battle with Dante. Infused with the power of Argosax, he attacks Lucia (first as a demonic version of himself). As he begins to lose, he mutates into a giant creature.

Argosax the Chaos
Argosax the Chaos was a cruel demonic deity who once rivaled Mundus and was the final antagonist of Devil May Cry 2. Like his sovereign, Argosax was imprisoned in the void of the Underworld by Sparda when the rebellious knight came to the aide of the clan of Dumary Island. Using the Arcanas—sacred relics used to exorcise Argosax centuries prior—Arius intended to absorb the demon's power to achieve apotheosis. Instead, as Dante had switched the Medaglia coin with his own, the ritual was incomplete and caused Arius to become possessed upon dying.

Despite its faulty execution, the ritual was sufficient enough to create a portal to the devil's prison—enough to enable Argosax to escape if given time. Seeking to put an end to this scheme, Dante elects to enter the gateway and face the demon deity like his father before him. When he first appears, his native form—the Despair Embodied, a fiery horned hermaphrodite with angelic wings—is gestating inside of a chrysalis composed of the reanimated corpses of assorted bosses from games 1 and 2. He's capable of channeling their power while in this form.

Emerging from the destroyed mass after a lengthy battle, the Despair Embodied challenges Dante. It is able to use energy and projectile attacks with its wings as well as teleport and shapeshift its arms into swords in its male form, and whips in its female form, as its main weapons. After another long confrontation, the demon's wings shatter from exhaustion and Dante finally destroys the disgraced lord with a lighting-infused gunshot from Ivory. However, with the portal having sealed behind him during their battle, Dante was now trapped in the demonic realm.

Arkham
 is the secondary antagonist in Devil May Cry 3, which takes place before the events of the first Devil May Cry game, and the estranged father of Lady. In the game, he is a scholar in the demonology and the supernatural who sought to break the seal Sparda made to prevent Temen-ni-gru tower from serving as a Hell Gate. Arkham also desired to become a demon. A failed attempt by sacrificing his wife Kalina Ann resulted in the left side of his face being scarred but gave him some power. Arkham tricks Vergil into helping him while assuming the guise of the lunatic  to lead Dante through Temen-ni-gru. He plays the brothers against each other along with exploiting Lady's attempts to avenge her mother, to bring all the factors of unsealing Temen-ni-gru into place.  Arkham then travels through the completed gate to retrieves the Force Edge, combining its power with the restored halves of Eva's amulet to absorb Sparda's power. Though he becomes a demon resembling Sparda, Arkham's body is unable to compensate for the power as he mutates into an amorphous abomination that Dante and Vergil defeat together. Arkham is reverted to his original state as he ends up back in the human world where Lady kills him.

The character, in his normal and Jester forms, is voiced and motion-captured by Adam D Clark. Arkham's name was intended to be Hyne (pronounced "Hai-neh"), but Reuben Langdon (who voices Dante) thought it would be inappropriate in English and convinced Capcom to change it. Jester's name was intended to be "Joker". One of the key themes of Devil May Cry 3 is familial conflict. Itsuno said he did not like the idea of Lady killing Arkham, as he believed a child should never kill their parent. Morihashi wanted this scene in the final product, along with Dante defeating Vergil, as themes of the game. To balance this, Morihashi wrote a scene leading up to Arkham's death, where Lady said that Arkham was her responsibility.

Sanctus
Sanctus is the primary antagonist in Devil May Cry 4. The proclaimed Vicar of Sparda and general of the Holy Knights, he is regarded as one of the greatest spiritual leaders of the Order of the Sword. Sanctus was apparently killed by Dante at the beginning of the game, but in reality, Sanctus survived as he had himself infused with demonic essence in an ascension ceremony. Sanctus originally planned to use Dante to give life to the Savior, a colossus in Sparda's image housing collected demon essence. But he decides to use Nero after his righthand, Angus, revealed the truth of the Order's actions. Sanctus takes matters into his own hands by having Agnus kidnap Kyrie to have the Savior absorb her so it can assimilate Nero. Sanctus than uses the Yamato to open the artificial Hellgates before merging into Savior to commence his plan to wipe out all demons and rule the world while projecting himself through an animated suit of armor. Dante manages to sabotage Sanctus's scheme before freeing Nero to rescue Kyrie while defeating a mental construct of Sanctus, Nero. He completely destroys him by using the Devil Bringer on the Savior. The character is voiced by Liam O'Brien in English with O'Brien also doing the motion capture for Sanctus, and Ikuya Sawaki in the Japanese version of Devil May Cry 4: Special Edition. Yoshikawa designed him  to become intimidating across the storyline.

Agnus
Agnus is the Order of Sparda's chief technology researcher and alchemist in Devil May Cry 4, developing demon-killing weapons for the Knights. An introverted workaholic with a habit of stuttering when stressed, Agnus rarely appears outside his office and very few in the cult know about him. It is later learned that he has been experimenting with the broken Yamato and created demon-based weapons like the Angelos, even turning himself into the insect-like Agnus Angelo before being killed by Dante when he attempts to keep him from the Yamato. He is indirectly mentioned with contempt by his surviving daughter Nico in Devil May Cry 5. The character is voiced by T. J. Storm in English, and Yūya Uchida in Japanese version of Devil May Cry 4: Special Edition.

Urizen
Urizen, the primary antagonist in Devil May Cry 5, is the demonic half of Vergil that came into being when Vergil used the Yamato to purge his humanity to become a full Demon. Urizen proceeds to plant a Qliphoth Tree in Red Grave City so he can acquire its fruit to become the undisputed ruler of the Underworld, only to be defeated by Dante and absorbed by his other half V. Urizen is voiced by Daniel Southworth in the English version and Shunsuke Sakuya in the Japanese version. Urizen was meant to remind players of Mundus, the original Demon King from the 2001 Devil May Cry game. Itsuno said, "Urizen is definitely the strongest enemy of the entire Devil May Cry saga ... the most powerful. You've seen it: every time he appears, he sits on his throne and, maybe sometimes, he moves a little, but that's it.  We want to make people understand how a fight against him can be completely crazy."

Supporting characters

Trish

Trish is a demon created by Mundus who strangely resembles Dante's mother, Eva. She has enhanced strength and agility, accelerated healing and the ability to use lightning. In English, Trish is voiced by Sarah Lafleur in Devil May Cry, and Viewtiful Joe: Red Hot Rumble, Danielle Burgio in Devil May Cry 4 and Marvel vs. Capcom 3/Ultimate Marvel vs. Capcom 3, Wendee Lee in Devil May Cry 5, and Luci Christian in The Animated Series. In Japanese, she is voiced by Atsuko Tanaka in The Animated Series, Marvel vs. Capcom 3/Ultimate Marvel vs. Capcom 3, and Devil May Cry 4: Special Edition.

Lady

Lady is a freelance demon hunter. A human, she is skilled in acrobatics and armed close quarters combat. Lady has black hair, eyes of different colors and a signature weapon, the Kalina-Ann (a customized missile launcher, similar to MANPADS). When fighting, she uses a CZ75 pistol with a compensator and a VZ61 submachine gun with a bayonet attached to it. She was named Mary by her father, Arkham, but she renounced the name when he murdered her mother in a ritual to obtain demonic power, an act which drove Mary to psychosis and obsessive vengeance. Lady first appears in Devil May Cry 3, when she refuses to identify herself to Dante; he replies, "Whatever, lady!" Lady formalizes her name in the game's denouement when she shoots Arkham, telling him that "Mary" is dead. Although she is not a villain, her role in Devil May Cry 3 is that of an antagonist, as she seeks to deter Dante and even fights him twice before finally coming to terms with him.

Sparda
Sparda is the demonic knight who rebelled for humanity's sake 2,000 years before the events of Vergil's Devil May Cry 4: Special Edition. He defeated many demons and their emperor, Mundus, before sealing the gateway between the demonic and human worlds. Sparda's heroism made him legendary in the human world, and he is known as "the Legendary Dark Knight".

In Devil May Cry and its successors, Sparda left his power in his sword (known as the Force Edge or the Sparda) in the demonic realm. ("Sparda" is the Japanese inflection for "spada", a Latin word for "sword".) To seal the gateway between the worlds Sparda sacrificed his blood and that of a mortal priestess, using two complementary amulets as a key which he brought into the human world. To work, the amulets must be joined. Near the end of his life Sparda took a human wife (Eva) and fathered twin sons (Dante and Vergil). He gave the amulets to Eva, who passed them on to their sons. Sparda also gave his sons enchanted swords with opposing powers: Dante's broadsword Rebellion that allows the user to absorb anything, and Vergil's katana Yamato that can split one's being or open a link to the Demon World. It is unknown how Sparda died, and Dante believed that there was a lot of confusion surrounding his father and his legacy.

Eva
Eva is Sparda's human wife and the mother of Dante and Vergil, giving her sons each half of Sparda's amulet as a birthday gift. Eva was murdered in her home in Red Grave City by demons sent by Mundus. She safely hid Dante away, but was killed while she was looking for Vergil. Mundus later created Trish with Eva's appearance in a failed attempt to lure Dante to his death.  In Devil May Cry 5, like Trish, Eva is voiced by Wendee Lee in English and Atsuko Tanaka in Japanese.

Patty Lowell
First appearing in The Animated Series, Patty is a young girl, descended from a powerful sorcerer who imprisoned the demon known as Abigail. After Dante protects her from some demons, she lives with him at Devil May Cry until Abigail is destroyed, after which she is reunited with her birth mother. Patty makes a voice-only cameo appearance in Devil May Cry 5, repeatedly attempting to invite Dante to her 18th birthday party. In English, Patty is voiced by Hilary Haag in The Animated Series and Haviland Stillwell in Devil May Cry 5. In Japanese, she is voiced by Misato Fukuen in the anime and Yū Shimamura in Devil May Cry 5.

J.D. Morrison
First appearing in The Animated Series, Morrison is Dante's closest friend and broker. He finds Dante jobs, acts as a handyman to keep Devil May Cry functioning, and offers him advice on how to be a better person. Morrison returns in Devil May Cry 5, having been heavily redesigned from his previous appearance. Following the game's events, Morrison becomes the new owner of the Devil May Cry office. In English, Morrison is voiced by Rob Mungle in The Animated Series and Joey Camen in Devil May Cry 5. In Japanese, he is voiced by Akio Ōtsuka.

Matier
Matier, a supporting character in Devil May Cry 2, is an old woman and (like Lucia) part of the Protectorate clan. When she was younger, she and her clan fought the demons with Sparda. Matier is cheerful and optimistic, certain of Dante's eventual victory. She guides Lucia to reunite the Arcanas (mystical relics) and lure Dante (whom she calls "Son of Sparda") to their island. Although it is first claimed that Matier is Lucia's mother, it is later revealed that Lucia was created by Arius (who planned to dispose of her when Matier found and raised her). The character is voiced by Flo DiRe.

Credo
Credo, captain of hundreds of Holy Knights, is a strict, just man who is admired for his prowess on the battlefield. Kyrie's older brother, he sees Nero as family, but finds him unreliable. He was designed with key motifs representing his job, which Yoshikawa found fun to create. He orders Nero to capture Dante for Sanctus' "assassination", but is part of Sanctus' plan to bring about the Order's "Savior". Credo tries to arrest Nero after he learns about the latter's demonic power, and transforms into a winged creature he believes is angelic. When Kyrie is kidnapped to be used by the Order for Sanctus's grand plan, Credo loses his faith in the Order for using his sister as a tool and tries to help Nero save her. He is mortally wounded by Sanctus while trying to save Nero from capture, and Nero is absorbed into the Savior. Dying, Credo asks Dante to save Nero and Kyrie as his body dissipates into light. He is voiced by TJ Rotolo in English, and Rikiya Koyama in the Japanese version of Devil May Cry 4: Special Edition. His devil form was meant to contrast Nero's and Dante's due to how he looks like a heroic person when he still looks like a demon.

Kyrie
Kyrie is a supporting character introduced in Devil May Cry 4. She was born and raised in Fortuna and works as a singer for the Order of the Sword. She is Credo's sister, and Nero's childhood friend and love interest. After being misled into thinking that Nero is evil, Kyrie was held hostage by Agnus under orders of Sanctus to lure Nero to the Savior. He arrives too late however, as she had already fused with the Savior. Her fusion causes Credo to defect from the Order after recognizing Santus' evil scheme. When Dante frees Nero from captivity in the Savior, Nero can free Kyrie as she begins her new life with him. She makes two off-screen cameos in Devil May Cry 5, the first when Nero lost the Devil Bringer and the second in renewing his resolve to end the animosity between Dante and Vergil. The character is voiced by Stephanie Sheh in the English versions and Saori Hayami in the Japanese versions, and motion-captured by Laura Napoli. Itsuno was responsible for most of Kyrie's elements. She was envisioned as an "ordinary, cute heroine" who had a big impact on Nero despite not being a fighter. Her role was to motivate Nero and the player as the story progresses.

Nicoletta "Nico" Goldstein
Nicoletta Goldstein, nicknamed Nico, is a weapons designer introduced in Devil May Cry 5 who acts as Nero's tech support. She is the daughter of Agnus, whom she speaks of with great disdain, and the granddaughter of Nell Goldstein, the gunsmith proprietor of ".45 Caliber Works" who made Dante's signature handguns, "Ebony & Ivory". She considers her weapons works of art, having developed Nero's Devil Breaker prosthetic arms. Nico is motion-captured and voiced by Faye Kingslee in English, and is voiced by Lynn in Japanese. Nico was created to be a contrasting heroine to Nero's girlfriend, Kyrie; Nico is more used to fighting.

Cultural impact

Critical reception
When Devil May Cry was released Dante's personality was praised, with IGN describing the character as a "maverick head-hunter", "believable" and "awesome". His confident, fearless attitude has made him popular; the character ranked seventh on GameCrush's Top 10: Most Badass Video Game Characters list and third on ScrewAttacks Top Ten Coolest Video Game Characters list. The original game's demonic enemies were "ferocious", the sub-bosses "incredibly tough" and the bosses (particularly Vergil) "very tough", providing many of the game's challenges. Eurogamer called the demons "some of the most bizarre-looking creatures you will find this side of American McGee's Alice" and the bosses "vast", with their battles requiring a variety of strategies (although the fight with Nightmare was considered repetitive). Because Dante and Vergil are half demon and half human, they were noted as bringing in religious overtones to the games, although this was initially subtle. Ninja Theory made a more direct reference to the way religion is portrayed in gaming while showing the parallels between the identical twins. On the other hand, the cast from the first Devil May Cry were felt to be underdeveloped.

In its review of Devil May Cry 2, GameSpot said that the characters lacked personality (based on the removal of Dante's distinctive traits). It also felt that Lucia's role was too small, not allowing the character time to develop. The website called the game's enemies "mindless", noting that most characters (including the bosses) could be defeated with the default attacks. Dante's younger persona in Devil May Cry 3 and the relationships he goes through in the narrative were also given a major focus by reviewers and found to be superior to Kamiya's original take. The missions where the player controls Vergil in Devil May Cry 3: Special Edition added "an all-new and unique play style". Being able to play his story arc was "such a blast that Capcom could probably have released his modes separately for $19.99 and gotten away with it" according to one reviewer.

The characters in Devil May Cry 4 were said to resemble a "legion of seraphim the likes of which gamers have never seen before, and it puts an interesting spin on what all of our preconceptions of 'good' are in a video game". 1UP.com noted that the enemies shared visual elements with the military personnel of actual religions: "Considering the visual nature of the heavily-armored, winged, angelic warriors scattered around the various missions, it'd be easy to confuse these characters with crusaders of Christian origin." Dante's dynamic with Nero in the following game garnered positive responses as critics found none of them overshadowed the other even if Dante's fans had to wait for the game's second half to control him while enjoying the older characterization.Devil May Cry 5s narrative was well received due to the handling of the characters and their connections. Despite liking Dante's relationship with Nero to the point of comparing them like father and son, USGamer found Dante's treatment of the younger demon hunter mean-spirited even though the character later reveals he does not want Nero to face Vergil because of their connection. Several critics focused on the increased number of moves available to the three protagonists. The Daily Telegraph praised the characters' mechanics, most notably V's for how differently he plays in contrast to Nero and Dante while still remaining entertaining. While IGN felt Dante was similar to his presentation in previous games, they noted the new weapons he presents were much more enjoyable. VideoGamer.com was more critical of the plot, believing the narrative, and villain were "dull" despite some interesting interactions in the storyline.

Merchandise
In addition to the games, anime and manga, Devil May Cry characters have appeared in merchandise including novels, comic books, a skin variety on the PlayStation Portable, a special edition of the PlayStation 3 console and several soundtracks. Capcom has made other merchandise available including concept art for The Animated Series, T-shirts, rings, collars and handbags. The series' popularity led to a line of action figures produced by Toycom; Kaiyodo produced a similar line for Devil May Cry 2 and a Devil May Cry  Dante action figure. Kotobukiya produced statues (including Vergil and Dante) based on the characters after the release of The Animated Series and Devil May Cry 4'', and other merchandise includes posters and framed stamps for the series' 10th anniversary.

References

 
Devil May Cry